Bob Wells (born 1955) is an American YouTuber, author, and advocate of minimalist, nomadic vandwelling.

Wells founded the Rubber Tramp Rendezvous, an annual gathering of van dwellers in Quartzsite, Arizona, and the Homes on Wheels Alliance, which assists needy individuals in acquiring vehicles for habitation and travel.

Early life 
 Wells's father worked as a union clerk at a Safeway in Anchorage, Alaska, and died two years after reaching retirement. Wells found himself employed in the same store, wanting to avoid his father's inability to enjoy retirement.

In 1995, feeling stuck after working 20 years at the store, and suffering a difficult divorce with two children, Wells found his finances constrained — and moved into a box van, purchased with his last $1,500. The experience left him crying himself to sleep most nights. After six years, he remarried, moved into a house, and relocated with his wife to North Carolina, where the stress of the marriage with a mortgage became too much.

After he and his second wife divorced, Wells began living in a truck camper, followed by a work van, and most recently, a four-wheel-drive ambulance.

Advocacy 
In 2005, after seeing a mother and her three children sleeping in a car, Wells created the website cheaprvliving.com, to provide tips, resources and strategies for living in a vehicle.

Rubber Tramp Rendezvous 
In January of each year, Wells organizes a get-together of vehicle dwellers in Quartzsite, Arizona, called the Rubber Tramp Rendezvous (RTR). The term "rubber tramp" refers to people who live in a vehicle, which use rubber tires. Attendees and other followers of the event are known as "The Tribe". The gathering itself has been described as the Burning Man for retirees.

In 2010, the first year of its existence, the RTR received 45 attendees. By 2018, it had attracted over 3,000 participants and by 2019 it had attracted 10,000 — making it the largest gathering of its kind in the world. Activities include seminars geared at vehicle dwelling, ranging from city and stealth-parking, repair and improvement seminars (e.g., installing solar panels), identifying resources such as inexpensive vision and dental care (e.g., in Los Algodones, or Baja California, Mexico) to locating free second-hand items.

YouTube 
In 2015, Wells started a YouTube channel called CheapRVliving to offer how-to videos, interviews with other vandwellers, and philosophical videos with inspiration by noted authors and thinkers. In May 2019, the channel was approaching 50 million views.

Homes on Wheels Alliance 
In October 2018, Wells announced the creation of Homes on Wheels Alliance, a 501(c)(3) charity of which he serves as president. The organization is dedicated to providing vehicles that have been converted into dwellings to individuals in need of financial assistance.

Influence 
Wells has been interviewed in documentaries and appeared on television news programs that focused on alternative lifestyles and simple living. He identifies politically with the far-left, and sees van dwelling as a rejection of modern society's norms. Wells was featured prominently in Nomadland, a nonfiction book following the exploits of different RV and vandwellers. He portrayed himself in the critically acclaimed 2020 film adaptation.

Works 
 How to Live In a Car, Van or RV: And Get Out of Debt, Travel, and Find True Freedom, CreateSpace Independent Publishing Platform, 2014

References

External links 
 Rubber Tramp Rendezvous
 Homes on Wheels Alliance
 Audio interview with Wells at NPR
 Wells' classes at Skillshare
 Wells' video courses at Udemy
 YouTube videos
 "Without Bound" by Michael Tubbs and Aaron Harlan
 "Freewheeling: The van life" by CBS
 "Living Your Best Life in a Van" by PBS

1950s births
21st-century American male writers
American male bloggers
American bloggers
American male non-fiction writers
American nomads
American self-help writers
American YouTubers
Charity fundraisers (people)
Simple living advocates
Writers from Anchorage, Alaska
Living people